St. Raphael's School was a private, coeducational Catholic elementary school in Long Island City, Queens in New York City. St. Raphael's campus encompasses 8 separate buildings situated on private grounds.

Saint Raphael School was founded in 1956, by the Religious Sisters of Mercy upon the urging of Msgr. John McMurray, then pastor of the now defunct St. Raphael Parish. It closed in 2012 after falling enrollment made continued operation untenable.

Academics
Prior to its closing, St. Raphael's boasted the following:

Student : teacher ratio of 5:1
An average class size of 15
Every year 100% of St. Raphael's graduates go on to Catholic high schools
State-of-the-art science laboratory
"Smartboard" technology in every classroom.
Over 100 brand new computers throughout the campus.

The school was Chartered by the State of New York and Accredited by the Middle States Association of Colleges and Schools.

References

External links

Educational institutions established in 1956
Educational institutions disestablished in 1912
Catholic elementary schools in New York City
Defunct schools in New York City
1956 establishments in New York City